St Barnabas Bethnal Green is a late 19th-century church in Bow in London, England. It is an Anglican church in the Diocese of London. The church is at the junction of Roman Road and Grove Road in the Bow West ward of London Borough of Tower Hamlets.

History of the building
The building was initially built in 1865 as  a Baptist chapel, to a design by William Wigginton, but was consecrated for the Church of England in 1870. It was built in a Gothic Revival style, built in yellow brick, banded with red and black. The church building, which is not oriented, was built with a broad chancel, nave, west gallery and an octagonal north west tower with a spire.

The church was badly damaged by bombing during the Second World War. Following the end of the war the steeple was removed and the church rebuilt, retaining  the tower and north and south walls. This remodelling was carried out by J Anthony Lewis of architects Michael Tapper & Lewis, who commissioned the sculptor Don Potter to create "The Four Evangelists" on the outside of the building (c.1957). Potter also created a font in Clipsham stone.

Activities
The PCC of St Barnabas Bethnal Green supports the Lesbian and Gay Christian Movement and is only the second congregation to have affiliated as a body.

From 2003 to 2012, the church played a key role in St Barnabas Community Fete (also known as Bowstock), whose director was the church's vicar, Father Brian Ralph.

References

External links 

 
 A Church Near You: St Barnabas Bethnal Green

Church of England church buildings in the London Borough of Tower Hamlets
19th-century Church of England church buildings
Diocese of London
Bow, London